Val Père Jacques, also known as Val or VPJ is a private French-language school in Bkenneya, Lebanon which teaches all scholar levels, and follows the official Program of Education in Lebanon.

History 
The school was founded in 1919 by Blessed Father Jacques Haddad, a Capuchin priest, as "École Saint François des Sœurs Franciscaines de la Croix".
It was located at the time in Jal El Dib. In 1980 the property was transferred to Bkenneya. Since, it is known as VAL PÈRE JACQUES.

Geographic location 
Region: Middle East
Country: Lebanon
City: Jal el Dib - Bkennaya / Biakout (In its far end)
Caza: El Metn
Mouhafazat: Mount Lebanon
Altitude: ≈125m

Clubs 
Astronomy Club 
Sports Club
Ecology Club
Social Club
Book Club (Awards: Goodreads Choice Award, National Book Award Finalist.)

Cycles 
Nursery Cycle
Primary School Cycle
Primary School Cycle
Complementary Cycle
Secondary Cycle

References

Private schools in Lebanon